Sahl may refer to:
Arabic  sahl  سهل  "easy", given name:
 Sahl ibn Bishr, Persian translator and astrologer 
Ibn Sahl (disambiguation)
 Abū Sahl al-Qūhī, Persian mathematician, physicist and astronomer
 Sahl Smbatean, medieval Armenian prince

Jewish given name סהל
 Sahl ben Matzliah (d. 990), Karaite hakam 
Jewish surname
 Hans Sahl (1902–1993), German literature-, film- and theatre-critic 
 Jan Sahl (born 1950), Norwegian politician
 Mort Sahl (1927–2021), American comedian and actor